The Whittemore House is a historic house in Arlington, Massachusetts.  The Greek Revival was built c. 1850, and is the only house in Arlington with the full temple-front treatment.  It as two-story fluted Doric columns supporting a projecting gable end with a fan louver in the tympanum area.  The entrance is located in the rightmost of the front facade's three bays, and is framed by sidelight and transom windows.  The building's corners are pilastered, and an entablature encircles the building below the roof.

The house was listed on the National Register of Historic Places in 1985.

See also
National Register of Historic Places listings in Arlington, Massachusetts

References

Houses completed in 1850
Houses on the National Register of Historic Places in Arlington, Massachusetts
Houses in Arlington, Massachusetts